Corella is a rural locality in the Gympie Region, Queensland, Australia.

Geography 
The North Coast railway line passes through the locality from the south-east (Tamaree) to the north-west (Curra). Most of the land to the west of the railway line is within the Curra State Forest which extends into Curra and Anderleigh. To the east of the railway line the land use is mostly grazing on native vegetation.

History 
Corella State School opened on 24 January 1927 and closed in 1940.

Education 
There are no schools in Corella. The nearest primary school is Chatsworth State School in neighbouring Chatsworth to the south-west. The nearest secondary school is James Nash State High School in Gympie to the south.

References 

Gympie Region
Localities in Queensland